This is a list of pyramids.

 Lepsius list of pyramids

 List of Egyptian pyramids
 List of Mesoamerican pyramids
 List of pyramid mausoleums in North America
 List of pyramids in Ireland
 List of Pyramids of Meroe
 List of tallest pyramids

See also 
 List of megalithic sites
 List of the oldest buildings in the world

 
Lists of building lists
Lists of ancient buildings and structures